Jacques Thibault (born 13 February 1958) is a Canadian speed skater. He competed at the 1980 Winter Olympics and the 1984 Winter Olympics.

References

1958 births
Living people
Canadian male speed skaters
Olympic speed skaters of Canada
Speed skaters at the 1980 Winter Olympics
Speed skaters at the 1984 Winter Olympics
Speed skaters from Quebec City
20th-century Canadian people